Parreira e Chouto is a civil parish in the municipality of Chamusca, Portugal. It was formed in 2013 by the merger of the former parishes Parreira and Chouto. The population in 2011 was 1,492, in an area of 338.41 km².

References

Freguesias of Chamusca